Fabris is a surname. Notable persons with that name include:

Antun Fabris, (1864–1904), Serbian journalist
Emilio De Fabris, (1808–1883), an Italian architect 
Enrico Fabris (born 1981), Italian speed skater 
Eurosia Fabris (1866–1932), Italian religious figure
Florencia Fabris (1975–2013), Argentine opera soprano
Gabriele Fabris (born 1988), Italian footballer
Pietro Fabris ( 1740–1792), Italian painter and engraver
Salvator Fabris (1544–1618), Italian fencing master
Samuel Fabris (born 1991), Belgian footballer
Umberto Fabris, Yugoslav politician

See also: